Jewish deicide is the notion that the Jews as a people were collectively responsible for the killing of Jesus. A Biblical justification for the charge of Jewish deicide is derived from Matthew 27:24–25. Some rabbinical authorities, such as Maimonides and, more recently, Zvi Yehuda Kook have asserted that Jesus was indeed stoned and hanged after being sentenced to death in a rabbinical court.

The notion arose in early Christianity, the charge was made by Justin Martyr and Melito of Sardis as early as the 2nd century. The accusation that the Jews were Christ-killers fed Christian antisemitism and spurred on acts of violence against Jews such as pogroms, massacres of Jews during the Crusades, expulsions of the Jews from England, France, Spain, Portugal and other places, and torture during the Spanish and Portuguese Inquisitions.

In the catechism which was produced by the Council of Trent in the mid-16th century, the Catholic Church taught the belief that the collectivity of sinful humanity was responsible for the death of Jesus, not only the Jews. In the Second Vatican Council (1962–1965), the Catholic Church under Pope Paul VI issued the declaration Nostra aetate that repudiated the idea of a collective, multigenerational Jewish guilt for the crucifixion of Jesus. It declared that the accusation could not be made "against all the Jews, without distinction, then alive, nor against the Jews of today".

Most other churches do not have any binding position on the matter, but some Christian denominations have issued declarations against the accusation.

Sources

Matthew 27:24–25 
A justification for the charge of Jewish deicide has been sought in Matthew 27:24–25:

The verse which reads: "And all the people answered, 'His blood be on us and on our children! is also referred to as the blood curse. In an essay regarding antisemitism, biblical scholar Amy-Jill Levine argues that this passage has caused more suffering throughout Jewish history than any other passage in the New Testament.

Many also point to the Gospel of John as evidence of Christian charges of deicide. As Samuel Sandmel writes, "John is widely regarded as either the most anti-Semitic or at least the most overtly anti-Semitic of the gospels." Support for this claim comes in several places throughout John, such as in John 5:16–18:

Some scholars describe this passage as irrefutably referencing and implicating the Jews in deicide, although many, such as scholar Robert Kysar, also argue that part of the severity of this charge comes more from those who read and understand the text than the text itself. John uses the term , Ioudaioi, meaning "the Jews" or "the Judeans", as the subject of these sentences. However, the notion that the Jew is meant to represent all Jews is often disputed, with many English translations rendering the phrase more specifically as "Jewish leaders". While the New Testament is often more subtle or leveled in accusations of deicide, many scholars hold that these works cannot be held in isolation, and must be considered in the context of their interpretation by later Christian communities.

Historicity of Matthew 27:24–25

According to the gospel accounts, Jewish authorities in Roman Judea charged Jesus with blasphemy and sought his execution, but lacked the authority to have Jesus put to death (John 18:31), so they brought Jesus to Pontius Pilate, the Roman governor of the province, who authorized Jesus' execution (John 19:16). The Jesus Seminar's Scholars Version translation note for John 18:31 adds: "it's illegal for us: The accuracy of this claim is doubtful." It is noted, for example, that Jewish authorities were responsible for the stoning of Saint Stephen in Acts 7:54 and of James the Just in Antiquities of the Jews without the consent of the governor. Josephus however, notes that the execution of James happened while the newly appointed governor Lucceius Albinus "was but upon the road" to assume his office. Also Acts relates that the stoning happened in a lynching-like manner, in the course of Stephen's public criticism of Jews who refused to believe in Jesus.

It has also been suggested that the Gospel accounts may have downplayed the role of the Romans in Jesus' death during a time when Christianity was struggling to gain acceptance among the then pagan or polytheist Roman world. Matthew 27:24–25, quoted above, has no counterpart in the other Gospels and some scholars see it as probably related to the destruction of Jerusalem in the year 70 A.D. Ulrich Luz describes it as "redactional fiction" invented by the author of the Gospel of Matthew. Some writers, viewing it as part of Matthew's anti-Jewish polemic, see in it the seeds of later Christian antisemitism.

In his 2011 book, Pope Benedict XVI, besides repudiating placing blame on the Jewish people, interprets the passage found in the Gospel of Matthew which has the crowd saying "Let his blood be upon us and upon our children" as not referring to the whole Jewish people.

Historicity of Barabbas
Some biblical scholars, including Benjamin Urrutia and Hyam Maccoby, go a step further by not only doubting the historicity of the blood curse statement in Matthew but also the existence of Barabbas. This theory is based on the fact that Barabbas's full name was given in early writings as Jesus Barabbas, meaning literally Jesus, son of the father. The theory is that this name originally referred to Jesus himself, and that when the crowd asked Pilate to release "Jesus, son of the father" they were referring to Jesus himself, as suggested also by Peter Cresswell. The theory suggests that further details around Barabbas are historical fiction based on a misunderstanding. The theory is disputed by other scholars.

Paul's First Letter to the Thessalonians 
The First Epistle to the Thessalonians also contains accusations of Jewish deicide:

According to Jeremy Cohen:

2nd century
The identification of the death of Jesus as the killing of God is first stated in "God is murdered" as early as 167 AD, in a tract bearing the title Peri Pascha that may have been designed to bolster a minor Christian sect's presence in Sardis, where Jews had a thriving community with excellent relations with Greeks, and which is attributed to a Quartodeciman, Melito of Sardis, a statement is made that appears to have transformed the charge that Jews had killed their own Messiah into the charge that the Jews had killed God himself. 

If so, the author would be the first writer in the Lukan-Pauline tradition to raise unambiguously the accusation of deicide against Jews. This text blames the Jews for allowing King Herod and Caiaphas to execute Jesus, despite their calling as God's people (i.e., both were Jewish). It says "you did not know, O Israel, that this one was the firstborn of God". The author does not attribute particular blame to Pontius Pilate, but only mentions that Pilate washed his hands of guilt.

4th century
John Chrysostom (c. 347 – 407) was an important Early Church Father who served as archbishop of Constantinople and is known for his fanatical antisemitism, collected in his homilies, such as Adversus Judaeos. The charge of Jewish deicide was the cornerstone of his theology, and he was the first to use the term deicide and the first Christian preacher to apply the word deicide to Jews collectively. He held that for this putative 'deicide', there was no expiation, pardon or indulgence possible. The first occurrence of the Latin word deicida occurs in a Latin sermon by Peter Chrysologus (c. 380 – c. 450). In the Latin version he wrote: Iudaeos [invidia] ... fecit esse deicidas, i.e., "[Envy] made the Jews deicides".

Recent discussions
The accuracy of the Gospel accounts' portrayal of Jewish complicity in Jesus' death has been vigorously debated in recent decades, with views which range from a denial of Jewish responsibility to a belief in extensive Jewish culpability. According to the Jesuit scholar Daniel Harrington, the consensus of Jewish and Christian scholars is that there is some Jewish responsibility, regarding not the Jewish people, but regarding only the probable involvement of the high priests in Jerusalem at the time and their allies. Many scholars read the story of the passion as an attempt to take the blame off Pilate and place it on the Jews, one which might have been at the time politically motivated. It is thought possible that Pilate ordered the crucifixion to avoid a riot, for example. Some scholars hold that the synoptic account is compatible with traditions in the Babylonian Talmud. The writings of Moses Maimonides (a medieval Sephardic Jewish philosopher) mentioned the hanging of a certain Jesus (identified in the sources as Yashu'a) on the eve of Passover. Maimonides considered Jesus as a Jewish renegade in revolt against Judaism; religion commanded the death of Jesus and his students; and Christianity was a religion attached to his name in a later period. In a passage widely censored in pre-modern editions for fear of the way it might feed into very real antisemitic attitudes, Maimonides wrote of "Jesus of Nazareth, who imagined that he was the Messiah, and was put to death by the court" (that is, "by a beth din") Maimonides position was defended in modern times by rabbi Zvi Yehuda Kook, who asserted Jewish responsibility and dismissed those who denied it as sycophants.

Liturgy

Eastern Christianity

The Holy Friday liturgy of the Eastern Orthodox Church, as well as the Byzantine Rite Catholic churches, uses the expression "impious and transgressing people", but the strongest expressions are in the Holy Thursday liturgy, which includes the same chant, after the eleventh Gospel reading, but also speaks of "the murderers of God, the lawless nation of the Jews", and, referring to "the assembly of the Jews", prays: "But give them, Lord, their reward, because they devised vain things against Thee."

Western Christianity

A liturgy with a similar pattern but with no specific mention of the Jews is found in the Improperia of the Roman Rite of the Catholic Church. A collect for the Jews is also said, traditionally calling for the conversion of the "faithless" and "blind" Jews, although this wording was removed after the Vatican II council. It had sometimes been thought, perhaps incorrectly, that "faithless" (in Latin, perfidis), meant "perfidious", i.e. treacherous.

In the Anglican Church, the 1662 Book of Common Prayer contains a similar collect for "Jews, Turks, Infidels, and Hereticks" for use on Good Friday, though it does not allude to any responsibility for the death of Jesus. Versions of the Improperia also appear in later versions, such as the 1989 Anglican Prayer Book of the Anglican Church of Southern Africa, commonly called The Solemn Adoration of Christ Crucified or The Reproaches. Although not part of Christian dogma, many Christians, including members of the clergy, preached that the Jewish people were collectively guilty for Jesus' death.

The Church of Jesus Christ of Latter-day Saints

The Church of Jesus Christ of Latter-day Saints (LDS) accepts additional scriptures about Jewish deicide.  The Book of Mormon teaches that Jesus came to the Jews because they were the only nation which was wicked enough to crucify him. It also teaches that the Jewish people were punished with death and destruction because of their wickedness. It teaches that God gave the gentiles the power to scatter the Jews and it connects their future gathering to their belief that Jesus is the Christ. According to the Doctrine & Covenants, after Jesus reveals himself to the Jews, they will weep because of their iniquities. It warns that if the Jewish people do not repent, the world will be destroyed.

Brigham Young, an early LDS prophet, taught the belief that the Jewish people were in a middle-tier of cursed lineages, below Lamanites (Native Americans) but above Cain's descendants (Black people), because they had crucified Jesus and the gathering in Jerusalem would be part of their penance for it. As part of the curse, they would not receive the gospel and if anyone converted to the church it would be proof that they were not actually Jewish. As more Jews began to assimilate into Northern America and Western Europe, church leaders began to soften their stance, saying instead that Lord was gradually withdrawing the curse and the Jews were beginning to believe in Christ, but that it wouldn't fully happen until Jesus returned. The Holocaust and the threats of Nazism were seen as fulfillment of prophecy that the Jews would be punished. Likewise, the establishment of Israel and the influx of Jewish people were seen as fulfillment of prophecy that they Jewish people would be gathered and the curse lifted.

In 1978, the LDS Church began to give the priesthood to all males regardless of race and it also began to de-emphasize the importance of race, instead, it adopted a more universal emphasis. This has led to a spectrum of views on how LDS members interpret scripture and previous teachings. According to research by Armand Mauss, most LDS members believe that God is perpetually punishing Jews for their part in the crucifixion of Jesus Christ and they will not be forgiven until they are converted.  These views were correlated with Christian hostility towards the Jews.  However, these hostile views were often counter-balanced with views that they share a common ancestry with the Jews.

Some Latter-Day Saints may argue against the idea that their scriptures promote Jewish Deicide, citing the Second Article of Faith as evidence against the idea of all Jews being punished for Jesus' crucifixion. The Second Article of Faith (contained in The Pearl of Great Price) states that "We believe that men will be punished for their own sins, and not for Adam’s transgression".

Repudiation

In the aftermath of World War II and The Holocaust, Jules Isaac, a French-Jewish historian and a Holocaust survivor, played a seminal role in documenting the antisemitic traditions which existed in the Catholic Church's thinking, instruction and liturgy. The move to draw up a formal document of repudiation gained momentum after Isaac obtained a private audience with Pope John XXIII in 1960. In the Second Vatican Council (1962–1965), the Catholic Church under Pope Paul VI issued the declaration Nostra aetate ("In Our Time"), which among other things repudiated belief in the collective Jewish guilt for the crucifixion of Jesus. Nostra aetate stated that, even though some Jewish authorities and those who followed them called for Jesus' death, the blame for what happened cannot be laid at the door of all Jews living at that time, nor can the Jews in our time be held guilty.

On November 16, 1998, the Church Council of the Evangelical Lutheran Church in America adopted a resolution which was prepared by its Consultative Panel on Lutheran–Jewish Relations. The resolution urged that any Lutheran church which was presenting a Passion play should adhere to its Guidelines for Lutheran–Jewish Relations, stating that "the New Testament ... must not be used as a justification for hostility towards present-day Jews", and it also stated that "blame for the death of Jesus should not be attributed to Judaism or the Jewish people."

Pope Benedict XVI also repudiated the Jewish deicide charge in his 2011 book Jesus of Nazareth, in which he interpreted the translation of "ochlos" in Matthew to mean the "crowd", rather than the Jewish people.

See also
 Anti-Judaism
 Antisemitism and the New Testament
 Antisemitism in Christianity
 Catholic Church and Judaism
 Antisemitic trope
 Christianity and Judaism
 Christian–Jewish reconciliation
 Criticism of Christianity
 Criticism of Judaism
 Faithful Word Baptist Church
 Jewish views on religious pluralism
 Judaism and Mormonism
 Judaism's view of Jesus
 Moses and Monotheism by Sigmund Freud
 Protestantism and Judaism
 Relations between Eastern Orthodoxy and Judaism
 Religious antisemitism
 Religious perspectives on Jesus
 Romany crucifixion legend
 Stereotypes of Jews
 Westboro Baptist Church

References

External links
 

Antisemitic canards
Caiaphas
Christian anti-Judaism
Christianity and antisemitism
Death of deities
Antisemitic slurs
Pontius Pilate
Barabbas